Herbert Leslie Haslegrave (1902–1999) was a British engineering academic who developed Loughborough Technical College into Loughborough University of Technology, and was its first Vice-Chancellor.

Education
Haslegrave was born in Yorkshire in 1902 and went to Wakefield Grammar School. He continued studying part-time at Bradford Technical College whilst working as an engineering apprentice with the English Electric Company, and gained an external degree of the University of London with first class honours. He then obtained a Whitworth Senior Scholarship which enabled him to go to Trinity Hall, Cambridge where he gained first class honours in the Mechanical Sciences Tripos and several awards.

Career
After a short period in industry he became a college lecturer, joining Wolverhampton & Staffordshire Technical College in 1931, then Bradford Technical College in 1932 and Loughborough College in 1935. He then held a series of posts as principal of colleges, respectively of St Helen’s Technical College, Barnsley Technical College and Leicester College of Technology.  In 1953 he became Principal of Loughborough College and developed it into a College of Advanced Technology in 1957 and to the UK’s first Technical University, Loughborough University of Technology in 1966.  He was its first Vice-Chancellor until his retirement in 1966.  In 1972, Haslegrave was President of the Whitworth Society. He died in September 1999.

References

Further reading
The Independent 23 October 1999 Obituary: Herbert Haslegrave (D. C. Freshwater)

1902 births
1999 deaths
British mechanical engineers
Engineering academics
People from the City of Wakefield
Alumni of Trinity Hall, Cambridge
Vice-Chancellors of Loughborough University
Engineers from Yorkshire